Krauschwitz is a municipality in the Görlitz district of Saxony, Germany at the border with Poland. It is situated on the western banks of the Lusatian Neisse river, south of Bad Muskau. The municipality was established on 1 January 1994 by the merger of the villages Klein Priebus, Krauschwitz, Pechern, Podrosche, Sagar, Skerbersdorf, and Werdeck.

The municipality is part of the recognized Sorbian settlement area in Saxony. Upper Sorbian has an official status next to German, all villages bear names in both languages.

The settlement Kruswica, after Upper Sorbian: Krušwa ("pear"), was first mentioned in a 1400 deed. Most of the area then belonged to the Upper Lusatian Muskau state country, except for the village of Pechern (Pěchč), which - together with abandoned Neudorf - formed the westernmost part of the Silesian Duchy of Żagań.

At Podrosche (Podroždź) is a road border crossing to the Polish village of Przewóz.

Twin towns 
 Gmina Przewóz, Poland
 Ottersweier, Germany

References 

Populated places in Görlitz (district)